Grajduri is a commune in Iași County, Western Moldavia, Romania. It is composed of seven villages: Cărbunari, Corcodel, Grajduri, Lunca, Pădureni, Poiana cu Cetate and Valea Satului.

References

Communes in Iași County
Localities in Western Moldavia